Neon, marketed as NEON until 2020, is a subscription video on demand (SVOD) service offering a range of television shows and movies. The platform is a division of Sky Network Television Limited.

History

In February 2015, Sky launched its Neon streaming service to allow New Zealanders to stream a range of HBO television shows including Game of Thrones, Crossbones, and True Blood. When Neon was first launched, Sky offered a 30-day free trial period for Neon, with normal subscriptions costing NZ$20 a month. Sky had originally planned to launch Neon in 2014 but was delayed by systems bugs. Neon's February launch was timed to compete with the US-based streaming service Netflix, which launched in New Zealand in March 2015.

In October 2016, a Roy Morgan poll found that 22,000 New Zealanders subscribed to Neon, which was outranked by the rival streaming services Netflix (264,000) and Spark New Zealand's Lightbox (128,000).

When Neon first launched in 2015, it only offered a TV and Movies package worth $20 a month. In August 2018, Neon launched an additional TV-only subscription package worth $12 a month. In September 2019, Neon replaced these two packages with  a combined television and movies package for NZ$13.95 a month in order to compete with Netflix, Lightbox, and Amazon Prime Video.

In October 2019, a Horizon Research survey found that 7% of more than 1,000 New Zealanders surveyed used Neon. The survey found that 59% used TVNZ OnDemand, 29% used Sky TV, 56% used Netflix, and 18% used Lightbox.

In mid December 2019,  Sky announced that it would be purchasing Spark New Zealand's streaming service Lightbox. In mid December 2019,  Sky announced that it would be purchasing Lightbox with the intention of merging Neon and Lightbox into one combined streaming service in 2020.

On 11 June, Neon experienced technical difficulties that caused users to be locked out of the app. In mid-June 2020, Sky announced that Lightbox would be merged into Neon, with Lightbox app being replaced by a Neon app on 7 July 2020. The merged service retained the Neon brand but continues to use Lightbox's interface and incorporates content drawn from both Neon and the old Lightbox. Existing Spark customers can receive a NZ$9.95 discount.

On 7 July, Sky formally merged the two streaming services, with the Lightbox app being revamped as Neon. The revamped streaming service allows users to stream on two devices, download films and shows onto devices, rent movies, and create user profiles. Following the merger, there were reports about technical glitches including users being unable to log into the app and the absence of the watchlist feature. Neon responded that it would address those issues.

On 23 February 2021, Sky reported that its total subscriber base for all of its services and platforms had risen to 990,000 including 154,000 former Lightbox subscribers, who had continued using Neon. Sky confirmed that one third of former “hard-bundled” Lightbox subscribers were using Neon. Sky TV also reported that the number of subscribers to its streaming services including Neon, Sky Sport Now, and RugbyPass had increased from 196,000 in the 2020 half year to 352,000 in the 2021 half year as a result of the COVID-19 pandemic in New Zealand.

In mid April 2021, Sky announced that it would be raising the price of its Neon streaming service to $15.99 a month, citing a growth in subscribers for its streaming services and declining revenue from its Sky Box subscriptions.

In mid July 2022, Neon confirmed that it would be raising the price of its standard streaming service to $17.99 a month and its annual plan to $179.99. In addition, the streaming service announced that it was also introducing a cheaper $12.99 basic subscription service.

Services
During its initial launch in February 2015, Neon was available on computers, iPhones, iPads and televisions that supported AirPlay. The service was later made available on Android smartphones and tablet computers. As of 2020, Neon is available on a range of devices including newer Samsung Smart TVs, Panasonic Smart TVs, Sony Android TVs, Freeview devices, PlayStation 4, Vodafone TV boxes, Chromecast devices, iOS devices and Apple TV via AirPlay, personal computers and MacBooks equipped with Adobe Flash Player, and selected ioS and Android phones and tablets.

Following the merger of Lightbox into Neon on 7 July 2020, the revamped Neon allows users to stream on two devices. It also has a download feature which allows users to download a maximum of five movies and 25 television shows onto mobiles and tablets. It also allows users to create five profiles and to add favourites to a watchlist. Neon also allows users to rent movies for a fee ranging between NZ$4.99 and NZ$25.00.

Content
Drawing upon Sky's New Zealand-exclusive contract with HBO, Neon has exclusive distribution rights for several HBO television shows including Game of Thrones, Big Little Lies, Chernobyl, Westworld, His Dark Materials, Watchmen, and the movie First Man.

Following the merger of Lightbox into Neon, Neon acquired the distribution rights to The Handmaid's Tale, Homeland, Outlander, and Breaking Bad for New Zealand.

In early March 2021, Neon confirmed that it would distribute Zack Snyder's Justice League in New Zealand.

In early October 2021, The New Zealand Herald reported that Neon and Sky's SoHo channel would distribute the Game of Thrones prequel series House of the Dragon.

Notes and references

External links
NEON

Companies based in Auckland
New Zealand subscription television services
PlayStation 4 software
Video on demand services
New Zealand companies established in 2015